There is a significant community of Egyptians in Italy.

Migration history
As early as the 2nd century BC, there is strong evidence for an Egyptian presence in Italy, in various professions including bankers, surgeons, actors, musicians, fortune tellers, soldiers, slaves, and the like.
In early modern times, after Napoleon's 1798-1801 Egypt Campaign, the degree of contact between Egypt and Europe began to increase again. In 1813, Egyptian leader Muhammad Ali sent an Egyptian mission to Italy to study printing arts.

However, the United Kingdom and France, rather than Italy, have been the preferred destinations for Egyptian expatriate academics and professionals; Italy, and especially Milan, tended to attract Egyptian businessmen and unskilled workers instead in the latter half of the 20th century. Even the exile to Italy of King Farouk of Egypt following the Egyptian Revolution of 1952 did not have much effect on Egyptian migration to Italy.

Employment
Many Egyptians are employed in food-related industries, and in Milan have come to dominate traditionally Italian trades such as pizza and other baked products. Other Egyptian businesses in Milan include coffee shops, restaurants, and halal butchers.

Religion

Egyptians in Italy are generally Muslim. Egyptian migrants increasingly prefer their children to maintain religious endogamy, especially in the case of their daughters. It was estimated in 2011 that there were also 20,000 to 25,000 Coptic Christians in Italy, heavily concentrated in the Milan metropolitan area.

Notable Egyptians in Italy

Magdi Allam (1952), journalist and politician
Adel Smith (1960-2014), founder of the Union of Italian Muslims
Alessio Sakara (1981), mixed martial artist and boxer
Omar Hassan (1987), artist
Stephan El Shaarawy (1992), footballer

See also 
 Egypt–Italy relations
 Arabs in Europe
 Arabs in Italy
 Moroccans in Italy
 Algerians in Italy
 Tunisians in Italy

References

Sources

African diaspora in Italy
Asian diaspora in Italy
Ethnic groups in Italy
Arabs in Italy
Italy
 
Muslim communities in Europe